Biosphere reserves are established according to the UNESCO's Man and the Biosphere Programme (MAB) to promote sustainable development for conservation of biological and cultural diversity. As of 2016, the Lal Suhanra Biosphere Reserve and Ziarat Juniper Forest are the only two biosphere reserve in Pakistan, which were approved by UNESCO in 1977 and 2013 respectively. A number of initiatives and projects have been undertaken to promote and develop other biosphere reserves in Pakistan but due to weak implementation this has not yet been materialized. In July 2012, Pakistan Museum of Natural History and Beijing Museum of Natural History signed a MoU to work on trans-boundary biodiversity and to improve MAB related activities in the  Karakoram, Himalaya, and Hindukush regions.

Lal Suhanra

Lal Suhanra is a biosphere reserve recognized by UNESCO in 1977 and IUCN Category V protected area. The site is also participating in the Sustainable Management of Marginal Drylands project of MAB's Drylands and Desertification programme.

Location and ecosystem
The reserve is located in the Cholistan Desert, 36 km east of Bhawalpur in Punjab, Pakistan. The region has a warm desert to semi-desert ecosystem and the climate of the area is hyper-arid. Average annual rainfall ranges from 100 to 250 mm and the groundwater is highly saline.

Wildlife and attractions
The wetland, Patisar Lake, was initially built as a water reservoir and was an important habitat for waterfowl in winter but is now largely covered with reed beds and aquatic vegetation. The park has around 160 species of birds including houbara bustard, marsh harrier, laggar falcon, peregrine falcon, kestrel, and Egyptian vulture, some of which are endangered species. Mammals in the region include blackbuck and Indian rhino which were both critically endangered and almost became extirpated but were re-introduced. A number of snake species are also found in the park including Russell's viper, Indian cobra, saw scaled viper, wolf snake, and sand boa.

Some archaeological remains of an ancient civilization are discovered along the dry Hakra River bed which crosses the park. According to 1997 statistics, around 1 million national and 50,000 foreign tourist visited the park each year. The Punjab government has plans to convert the Lal Sohanra National Park into a wildlife safari park. One of the prominent attractions is the lion safari which allows guests to see lions in their natural habitat at close range.

Ziarat Juniper Forest

Ziarat Juniper Forest is a biosphere reserve recognized by UNESCO in 2013. It is the largest contiguous natural Juniper forest in Pakistan. It is also the second oldest, trailing behind the one in California. The forest ecosystem is considered to be the second largest in the world and is home to some of the oldest species of Juniperus excelsa. The forest has a global significance because it is considered vital for carbon sequestration.

Location

Wildlife
There are many important species found in this ecosystem including animal and birds, The Suleiman markhor, urial, black bear, and wolf, as well as more common species such as Afghan pika, fox, jackal, and several species of birds like chukar partridge are found. The forest also contains a rich diversity of plant species of medicinal significance with over 50 percent of the 54 cataloged species known to have medicinal or ethno-botanic value, which local people use as indigenous treatments for a variety of diseases. In Ziarat a herb called Ephedrasinica is found in abundance from which a chemical called ephedrine is extracted.

Palas valley

Palas Valley is a potential biosphere reserve located in Kohistan District of the Khyber Pakhtunkhwa province. The valley is home to rare and endemic wildlife and flora. The largest population of the endangered western tragopan can be found in the valley. Palas also supports population of 7 other rare species of birds including Tytler's leaf warbler. In 2003, a field mission conducted detailed studies of the region to determine its potential for World Heritage Site or MAB Biosphere Reserve. Their study concluded that the region has the attributes for a biosphere reserve however certain issues persist such continued preservation of the valley and involvement of the local population.

See also
National Parks of Pakistan
Protected areas of Pakistan

References

National parks of Pakistan
Protected areas of Pakistan